Badrukhan is a big village about 5 km from Sangrur, the district headquarters, on Sangrur-Barnala road in Punjab, India.

History
The residents of five small villages, Vada Agwarh, Vichla Agwarh, Dalamwal, Dhaliwas and Thagan wali Patti, under the leadership of Pandit Badru, approached Great Jat ruler Maharaja Gajpat Singh, the Maharaja of Jind, for security from dacoits. Maharaja Gajpat Singh amalgamated these villages and named it Badrukhan. In 1763, when Gajpat Singh captured the town of Jind, Badrukhan was made the capital of Jind State. He also built a fort here.

Badrukhan is believed to be the birthplace of mother of Maharaja Ranjit Singh(Raj kaur )and Maharaja Hira Singh of Nabha.

Present
The village has a Government Senior Secondary school, a 4-bedded subsidiary health center and a post office.

Notable people
 Lt. Gen. Harbaksh Singh, Padma Vibhushan, Padma Bhushan and Vir Chakra
 Pandit Durga Das Bhardwaj, Revenue Wajeer, Jind Riyasat
 Amaranth Patwari ( Kaka Patwari) 
Tarsem Chand Bhardwaj, Manager, Punjab Agro. 
Dr Vikram Bhardwaj, ENT HEAD AND NECK DOCTOR, DMC LUDHIANA. 2010. Senior Doctor of ear nose throat and cancer surgery in Delhi.https://g.co/kgs/A1RrM1
Navpreet Singh Gosal

References

Villages in Sangrur district